Angelo Puccinelli or Puccinèlli (Lucca, 14th century) was an Italian painter

In 1380, documents show he was in Siena, where he was likely influenced by Lippo Memmi. Among the only signed works are a Marriage of St Catherine, a Madonna and Bambino (1393, found in Museo di Villa Guinigi of Lucca, and the Transit of the Virgin (1386, found in the church of Santa Maria Forisportam, which appear influenced by Spinello Aretino.

References

15th-century Italian painters
Quattrocento painters
Italian male painters
Painters from Lucca
Painters from Siena